The Definitive Collection is a compilation of the greatest hits by Olivia Newton-John, an internationally recognised singer and actress. The album was released in 2001 by BMG Records and featured 22 tracks.

Track listing 
"You're the One That I Want"
"Xanadu"
"Magic"
"Sam"
"I Honestly Love You"
"Hopelessly Devoted to You"
"Suddenly"
"I Need Love"
"A Little More Love"
"Summer Nights"
"Physical"
"What Is Life"
"Heart Attack"
"Landslide"
"Make a Move on Me"
"Have You Never Been Mellow"
"Deeper Than the Night"
"Banks of the Ohio"
"Take Me Home, Country Roads"
"Long Live Love"
"If Not For You"
"Grease Megamix"

In Japan, the order was as follows ("Make a Move on Me" was replaced by "Jolene"):
"Have You Never Been Mellow"
"Xanadu"
"Physical"
"I Honestly Love You"
"Jolene"
"Magic"
"You're the One That I Want"
"Sam"
"Take Me Home, Country Roads"
"If Not for You"
"Hopelessly Devoted to You"
"Suddenly"
"I Need Love"
"Summer Nights"
"Heart Attack"
"Landslide"
"A Little More Love"
"What Is Life"
"Deeper Than the Night"
"Banks of the Ohio"
"Long Live Love"
"Grease Megamix"

Charts

Weekly charts

Year-end charts

Certifications and sales

References

2001 greatest hits albums
Olivia Newton-John compilation albums